Lyceum-Northwestern University (L-NU) is a medical college located in Dagupan, Philippines, founded by Dr. Francisco Quimson Duque and Mrs. Florencia Tiongson Duque in 1969.

Lyceum-Northwestern University though bearing the name Lyceum is not affiliated with Lyceum of the Philippines University since LPU is the first institution in the country to bear the name Lyceum.

History
Lyceum-Northwestern started as a single-room nursing school at the Dagupan City Polyclinic Hospital and was then called the Dagupan City School of Nursing. In 1974, Dr. Duque acquired the Northwestern Educational Institution. From the merger emerged the name Lyceum-Northwestern. In the latter part of the year, Lyceum-Northwestern spearheaded a consortium of local tertiary schools and founded the Northern Philippines Institute of Medicine. Lyceum-Northwestern became the "first medical school of the north." The institute began with an enrollment of 19 students. The consortium lasted two years.

On November 19, 2001, Lyceum-Northwestern was granted its university status.

Degree Programs

ALLIED MEDICAL PROGRAMS
   BS in Biology
   BS in Medical Laboratory Science
   BS in Nursing
   BS in Nutrition & Dietetics
   BS in Pharmacy
   BS in Physical Therapy
   BS in Psychology
   BS in Radiologic Technology
   Doctor of Medicine
   Doctor of Dental Medicine
   Doctor of Optometry

LIBERAL ARTS & EDUCATION PROGRAMS
  BA in English
  BA in Mass Communication
  BA in Political Science
  Bachelor of Arts (A.B.ETEAAP)
  Bachelor of Elementary Education
  Bachelor of Secondary Education (Majors in English, Physical Science, Social Science, Mathematics, & Filipino)
  Bachelor of Physical Education

BUSINESS, HOSPITALITY, & SOCIAL SCIENCE PROGRAMS
  BS in Accountancy
  BS in Entrepreneurship
  BS in Tourism Management
  BS in Hospitality Management
  BS in Business Administration (Majors in Marketing Management, Human Resources Development Management, Financial Management)
  BS in Criminal Justice Education (Criminology)

TECHNICAL-VOCATIONAL PROGRAMS
  RAC Servicing NC II
  Electrical Installation Maintenance NC II
  Shielded Metal Arc Welding NC II
  Caregiving NC II
  Health Care Services NC II
  Automotive Servicing NC II

POST GRADUATE PROGRAMS
  Juris Doctor (Bachelor of Laws)
  Doctor of Business Administration
  Doctor of Education
  Doctor of Philosophy (Ph.D.) (Ph.D. in Filipino Language, Science Education, Language Teaching, Educational Management)
  Doctor of Public Administration
  Master in Public Administration
  Master of Arts in Education
  Master in Public Health
  Master of Arts in Nursing

NON-THESIS PROGRAMS
  Master in Education (Majors in English, Mathematics, General Science/Biology, Social Studies, Filipino, Chemistry, Technical and Livelihood Education (T.L.E.)

ENGINEERING MARITIME EDUCATION & INFORMATION TECHNOLOGY PROGRAMS
  BS in Architecture
  BS in Civil Engineering
  BS in Computer Engineering
  BS in Electrical Engineering
  BS in Electronics & Communication Engineering
  BS in Mechanical Engineering
  BS in Marine Engineering
  BS in Computer Science
  BS in Information Technology
  BS in Marine Transportation

Sports
Salvador T. Duque Fieldhouse (Indoor Gymnasium and Basketball Court)
2 outdoor basketball courts
2 outdoor tennis courts
1 outdoor volleyball courts
1 football field
1 Olympic-sized swimming pool and 1 regular Pool

References

External links 
 Official website
 for Medicine international students

Universities and colleges in Dagupan
Nursing schools in the Philippines
Dental schools in the Philippines